The right gastroepiploic artery (or right gastro-omental artery)  is one of the two terminal branches of the gastroduodenal artery. It runs from right to left along the greater curvature of the stomach, between the layers of the greater omentum, anastomosing with the left gastroepiploic artery, a branch of the splenic artery.

Except at the pylorus where it is in contact with the stomach, it lies about a finger's breadth from the greater curvature.

Branches
This vessel gives off numerous branches:
 "gastric branches": ascend to supply both surfaces of the stomach.
 "omental branches": descend to supply the greater omentum and anastomose with branches of the middle colic.

Use in coronary artery surgery
The right gastroepiploic artery was first used as a coronary artery bypass graft (CABG) in 1984 by John Pym and colleagues at Queen's University. It has become an accepted alternative conduit, and is particularly useful in patients who do not have suitable saphenous veins to harvest for grafts. The right gastroepiploic artery is typically used as a graft to coronary arteries on the posterior wall of the heart such as the right coronary artery and the posterior descending branch.

References

External links
  - "Branches of the celiac trunk."
  - "Stomach, Spleen and Liver: The Right and Left Gastroepiploic Artery"
 

Arteries of the abdomen
Stomach